Talakuh (also Romanized as Ţālakūh; also known as Talakukh and Tāleh Kūh) is a village in Khorgam Rural District, Khorgam District, Rudbar County, Gilan Province, Iran. At the 2006 census, its population was 208, in 61 families.

References 

Populated places in Rudbar County